The Cheney Award is an aviation award presented by the United States Air Force in memory of 1st Lt. William H. Cheney, who was killed in an air collision over Foggia, Italy on January 20, 1918. It was established in 1927, and is awarded to an airman for an act of valor, extreme fortitude or self-sacrifice in a humanitarian interest, performed in connection with aircraft, but not necessarily of a military nature.

Past Awardees 

1927 MSgt Harry A. Chapman - First Recipient of the award for actions at the Roma airship crash
1928 2Lt Uzal Girard Ent
1929 William Albert Matheny
1930 No Award 
1931 Lt R.D. Moor and Pvt J.B. Smith
1932 Pfc Arden M. Farley
1933 2Lt William L. Bogen, SSgt Doy D. Dodd, Sgt Thomas J. Rogers
1935 1Lt Robert K. Giovannoli
1936 Maj Frederick D. Lynch, SSgt Joseph L. Murray
1939 1Lt Harold L. Neely
1946 Sgt Larry Lambert - first live subject of a US ejector seat
1948 Col Gail S. Halvorsen
1949 Capt. William E. Blair
1950 Sgt. Paul Prosper Ramoneda
1951 Capt. Daniel J. Miller
1952 Capt. Kendrick U. Reeves
1953 Capt. Edward G. Sperry
1954 Col. John Stapp
1955 William Sutherland
1956 MSgt. Leonard J. Bachetti
1957 First Lieutenant Robert M. Kerr
1959 Capt Herbert L. Mattox, Jr
1960 Capt Alfred S. Despres Jr
1961 1Lt William A. Luther and MSgt Lawrence G. Seckley
1962 Maj. Rudolf Anderson, Jr
1965 Capt James A Darden, Jr and Capt Robert S Henderson
1967 A1C Duane Hackney
1968 Sgt Thomas Newman
1969 Sgt Isidro Arroyo Jr
1970 Maj Travis Wofford
1974 Capt Steven L. Bennett
1975 1LT Regina Aune (First woman to win the Cheney trophy)
1977 SSgt James T. Carter
1979 Capt Kenneth R. Rees and TSgt John L. Pighini
1980 Capt Ronald W. Summers and 1Lt Kim F.P. Skrinak
1981 TSgt David J. Gerke and TSgt Tommie C. Wood
1982 Capt. Greg Engelbreit and Capt. Fred Wilson
1983 SSgt Jeffrey Yates Jones (posthumous)
1984 Captain John C. Ritchie
1985 Major Larry Clemons
1986 Capt Scott A. Chavez
1988 TSGT William A Wray
1992 Major Richard Brian Mcnabb and Major Stephen J. Laushine
1993 John L. Brainerd
1994 SrA Matthew A. Wells and SrA Jesse W. Goerz
1995 Capt. Charles M. Moncrief and Capt. Charles M. Harmon
1996 Major Marshall B. "Brad" Webb
2000 TSgt. Jeanne M. Vogt (First enlisted woman to be awarded the Cheney Award)
2001 TSgt. Thomas Fields
2002 Majl Kevin Churchill and Capt. Sean LeRoy
2003 1Lt. Randell Voas and 1Lt. Craig Prather
2004 Maj. John Groves
2005 SSgt Patrick Mortell
2007 Maj. Brad Downs and Maj Dan Roesch
2008 Capt. Chad Bubanas
2009 Maj. John G. Mangan
2010 Maj. John Foy and Capt. Patrick Markey
2011 Capt. Kenneth Green and Master Sgt. Joseph Brownell
2012 Capt. Thaddeus L Ronnau
2013 MSgt William T. Fritsch
2015 Capt. Melonie Parmley and SSgt Eric McElroy
2016 MSgt Christian M. Egger
2018 Maj. Kyle T. Waite

See also

 List of aviation awards
 Ruth Cheney Streeter sister of William H. Cheney

References

Aviation awards
Awards and decorations of the United States Air Force
Awards established in 1927
1927 establishments in the United States